Casper's Scare School (also known as Casper's Scare School: The Animated Series) is a computer-animated series based on the computer-animated film of the same name featuring the Harvey Comics cartoon character Casper the Friendly Ghost. The series premiered in Canada on YTV on January 11, 2009, and then in France on TF1's TFOU block on April 1, 2009, and later in the United States on Cartoon Network on October 4, 2009.

A second season aired in 2012 with a new opening sequence, a new voice cast and a slightly different CGI animation style. 52 episodes were produced.

Premise
Casper has to be able to graduate through the Scare School before he gets banished to the valley of the shadows forever. He goes on many adventures with the students that attend there.

Characters

 Casper (voiced by Robbie Sublett in season 1, and by Matthew Géczy in season 2)

Production
The series is co-produced by Classic Media, MoonScoop Group and DQ Entertainment, with participation from TF1, The Harvey Entertainment Company (as an in-name only unit since Classic Media acquired their library in 2001) and CNC. 
 
The complete first season aired between October and November 2009.

The second season aired on October 2, 2012, on Cartoon Network featuring a new title theme, recasting all the voices and with new edited CGI animation. One of the new voice actors was Matthew Geczy who started in Code Lyoko, another France production. Jimmy's voice is similar to the movie version. The characters whose voices dramatically changed were Casper, Thatch, Stinky, Stretch, Wolfie and Alder, all voiced by Geczy, given a voice similar to his character, Odd Della Robbia from Code Lyoko. Geczy also voices numerous characters. Many other actors from said show also work on it such as Mirabelle Kirkland who voiced Yumi Ishiyama in Code Lyoko now plays Mantha and Jimmy in the second season. Some background characters were given larger roles and speaking roles and the personalities of some characters have changed, mostly with Thatch having a tender side of playing with rubber ducks.

Episodes

Series overview

Season 1 (2009)

Season 2 (2012)

Home media
On August 10, 2010, Classic Media and Vivendi Entertainment released Casper's Scare School: 12 monstrous episodes on DVD in Region 1. This collection features the first 12 episodes of the series.

See also
 List of ghost films

References

External links
 
https://web.archive.org/web/20120317202032/http://eastershow.com.au/entertainment/EBEAB55B62A0490B8C2C6CB3DD83360B.aspx

2000s American animated television series
2010s American animated television series
2009 American television series debuts
2012 American television series endings
2000s French animated television series
2010s French animated television series
2009 French television series debuts
2012 French television series endings
American animated television spin-offs
American children's animated comedy television series
American children's animated fantasy television series
American children's animated horror television series
American computer-animated television series
Animated television shows based on films
English-language television shows
French-language television shows
French animated television spin-offs
French children's animated comedy television series
French children's animated fantasy television series
French children's animated horror television series
French computer-animated television series
Animated television series about children
Animated television series about ghosts
Television series by Universal Television
Casper the Friendly Ghost